The 8th IAAF World Cup in Athletics were held September 11–13, 1998 at the Johannesburg Stadium in Johannesburg, South Africa.

Overall results

Medal summary

Men

1 The United States originally won this event in 2:59.28, but were disqualified in 2009 after Antonio Pettigrew admitted to using HGH and EPO between 1997 and 2003.

Women

Results

References
 IAAF homepage with Results
 Full Results by IAAF

IAAF Continental Cup
World Cup
1998 in South African sport
International athletics competitions hosted by South Africa
September 1998 sports events in Africa
Sports competitions in Johannesburg
1990s in Johannesburg